The Zeletin is a left tributary of the river Berheci in Romania. It discharges into the Berheci in Gohor.

Towns and villages

The following towns and villages are situated along the river Zeletin, from source to mouth: Țâgâra, Satu Nou, Spria, Călini, Colonești, Zăpodia, Dănăila, Magazia, Barcana, Răchitoasa, Tochilea, Oprișești, Burdusaci, Motoșeni, Răzeșu, Glăvănești, Podu Turcului, Hanța, Plăcințeni, Tănăsoaia, Galbeni, Nănești, Cosițeni, Gohor.

Tributaries

The following rivers are tributaries to the river Zeletin (from source to mouth):

Left: Diaconeasa, Capra, Diulești, Boloia, Valea Rea de Jos
Right: Răchitoasa, Gunoaia, Sohodol, Drobotfor, Apa Neagră

References

Rivers of Romania
Rivers of Bacău County
Rivers of Vrancea County
Rivers of Galați County